Kamaz Master is the Russian motorsport team founded in 1988. It is a long-time winner and medallist of different motorsport competitions for many years.

Gallery

References 

Russian auto racing teams
Dakar rally racing teams
Auto racing teams established in 1988